Zababdeh or Zababida is a Palestinian town in the northern West Bank located  southeast of Jenin and  from the Arab American University.

History
Sherds from   Middle Bronze Age II, Iron Age I & II, through to the   Byzantine era   have been found at the site.

Remains of a Frankish bovaria (=farm) has been noted, while sherds from the Mamluk and Ottoman era have also been found.

Ottoman era
The village was (re-)founded in 1834, during the Ottoman era, by three Christian Greek Orthodox families who purchased the land from Jenin Muslims. In 1838 "Zabedet" was noted as a Greek Christian village in the Haritheh area, north of Nablus.

In 1882, the PEF's Survey of Western Palestine (SWP) described it as a "moderate sized village at the south edge of the arable plain called Wady es Selhab, supplied by a well on the east, with a low hill covered with brushwood on the south."
The Latin Catholic mission established its presence in the village in 1883.

In the 19th century sister Marie-Alphonsine Danil Ghattas lived here.

British Mandate era
In the 1922 census of Palestine, conducted by the British Mandate authorities, Zababdeh had a population of 482; 64 Muslims and 418 Christians, where the Christians were 83 Orthodox,  261 Roman Catholics and 74 Church of England.  In the 1931 census the number of inhabitants had increased to 632; 91 Muslims and 541 Christians, in a total of 134 houses.

In  1945 Village Statistics  Zababida had a population of 870; 90 Muslims and 780 Christians, and the jurisdiction of the village was 5,719 dunams of land, according to an official land and population survey. 2,510 dunams were used for plantations and irrigable land, 3,067 dunams for cereals, while 16 dunams were built-up (urban) land.

Jordanian era
After the 1948 Arab-Israeli War, Zababdeh was ruled by the Hashemites of Jordan.

In 1961, the population of Zababide was  1,474, of whom 1,077 were Christian.

Post-1967
Zababdeh came under Israeli occupation along with the rest of the West Bank during the 1967 Six-Day War.  The population of Kufeir Zababida in the 1967 census conducted by  Israel was 1,520, of whom 329  originated from the Israeli territory.

According to the Palestinian Central Bureau of Statistics 2007 census, there were 3,665 residents, of which roughly two-thirds are Christians, and by law the mayor has to be a Christian., divided into Latin, Greek Orthodox, Greek Catholic and Anglican communities. For two decades, from 1974–75 until he was posted to a position as parish priest in Gaza (1995), the village priest was Manuel Musallam, a Fatah activist and native of Birzeit, who developed excellent educational facilities in the village that attracted commuting Muslim students from Jenin. Conflicts with Muslim residents are rare, according to Weaver.

Families
 Awwad
 Dawoud
 Daibes
 Diab
 Esaid (Saeed)
 Kasbari
 Khalil Ibrahim
 Sharqawi
 Turkman
 Two Khoury families related only by marriage
 Abu-Zaineh 
Antabil
 Abu Sahliya
 Obaid
 Musallam

In media
Zababdeh was featured in a short film Salt of the Earth: Palestinian Christians in the Northern West Bank examining the lives of nine Palestinian Christians living in and around the cities of Jenin and Nablus. Released by Salt Films, Inc., in 2004, the film was produced by Presbyterian missionaries Marthame and Elizabeth Sanders while they lived and worked in the Palestinian Christian village of Zababdeh.

Twin towns – sister cities

Zababdeh is twinned with:

 Ixelles, Belgium
 Graz, Austria

See also
Khouloud Daibes
Palestinian Christians
Salt of the Earth: Palestinian Christians in the Northern West Bank

References

Bibliography

  
 (p. 125)

External links
Zababdeh Official Website-Rajaie
Welcome To al-Zababida
Zababdeh, Welcome to Palestine
Survey of Western Palestine, Map 12:  IAA, Wikimedia commons 
ZABABDEH, Palestine-family.net

Villages in the West Bank
Jenin Governorate
Palestinian Christian communities
Municipalities of West Bank